Ryssota ovum, the polished muffin, is a species of large air-breathing land snail, a terrestrial pulmonate gastropod mollusk in the family Helicarionidae.

Distribution
Ryssota ovum is endemic to the Philippines, mainly in Luzon and in the island of Panay.

Habitat
Ryssota ovum can normally be found underneath forest leaves and branches at the buttresses of tree. This species depends on moisture for survival. So it is abundant during the rainy season, while in the dry season it is present only in damp areas or in cool places.

Description
This species is the largest land snail in the Philippines. These very large shells vary in color from pale brown to maroon and sometimes they show a brighter apex. The aperture  is large and the interior may be white or bluish-white.

Behavior
Ryssota ovum is nocturnal. As darkness approaches, these land snails start to move and feed on decomposing forest debris. At daybreak, they hide themselves among the forest litter. They are well-camouflaged in the soil at the base of trees among roots, fallen rotten branches, dead leaves or weathered rock surfaces.

Human culture
The meat of these land snails (in Filipino called Bayuku) are considered  a delicacy in Philippines. The empty shells are used as salt containers, ashtrays and drinking vessels.

Bibliography
 Solatre, JS 2003. Characterization of the Habitat and Food Preference of Bayuku (Ryssota Ovum Val.) in Mt. Makiling Forest Reserve. UP Open University.
Abbott, R. T. (1989): Compendium of Landshells. A color guide to more than 2,000 of the World's Terrestrial Shells. 240 S., American Malacologists. Melbourne, Fl, Burlington, Ma. 
ERDB. Bayuku: A Delicacy and An Ally in a Forest Landscape - Llamas, J. 2003. Agroforestry - Institute of Agroforestry. Canopy International. Vol. 16 (6): p 3.
Férussac, A. E. J. P. J. F. d'Audebard de [1821-1822]. Tableaux systématiques des animaux mollusques classés en familles naturelles, dans lesquels on a établi la concordance de tous les systèmes; suivis d'un prodrome général pour tous les mollusques terrestres ou fluviatiles, vivants ou fossiles
Paul Bartsch: A Synopsis of the Philippine Land Mollusks of the Subgenus Ryssota. In: Proceedings of the Biological Society of Washington Vol. 51, S. 101-120, 193
Quiñones, NC 1994. Some Facts and Updates on Edible Snails and Snail Farming. Tigerpaper. Vol. 21(1): p. 8-14..
Springsteen, F.J. & Leobrera, F.M. 1986. Shells of the Philippines. Carfel Seashell Museum, Philippines: 1-377.

References

External links
 Schnecken-und-muscheln

Helicarionidae